Jimei may refer to:
Jimei Bridge, Xiamen
Jimei District a district of Xiamen, China.
Jimei University a university in Xiamen, China.